Doğukan Coşar is a Turkish world champion judoka with Down syndrome. He competes in the 81 kg division of T21 disability category.

References

Living people
Sportspeople with Down syndrome
Turkish people with disabilities
Turkish male judoka
Year of birth missing (living people)